Christopher Emdin is the Robert Naslund Endowed Chair in Curriculum and Teaching at the University of Southern California. He is an American academic who was previously an Associate Professor of Science Education at the Teachers College, Columbia University where he also served as Director of Science Education at the Center for Health Equity and Urban Science Education (CHEUSE). He was a noted author of the Obama White House and regular contributor to HuffPost. He developed and partnered with the rapper GZA and the website Rap Genius to develop the Science Genius B.A.T.T.L.E.S, which engages students in science through the creation of raps and a final rap battle competition. Emdin is founder of the #HipHopEd web chat and social movement.

Academic background 
Emdin holds a bachelor's degrees in Physical Anthropology, Biology, and Chemistry from Lehman College (2000). He also holds a M.S. in Natural Sciences from Rensselaer Polytechnic Institute (2003), and a PhD in Urban Education from the Graduate Center of the City University of New York, (2007).

Bibliography 
Emdin is the author of several books including: Urban Science Education for the Hip-Hop Generation, 2010; New York Times bestseller, For White Folks Who Teach In the Hood...and the Rest of Y'all Too: Reality Pedagogy and Urban Education, 2017; Between the World and the Urban Classroom, 2017, with George Sirrakos; and #HipHopEd: The Compilation on Hip-Hop Education, 2018, with Edmund Adjapong. His next book, Ratchedemic, is slated for release in 2021 from Beacon Press.

References

External links 
 Prof. Emdin's Columbia University website
 Chris Emdin's personal website
 
 Christopher Emdin: Teach teachers how to create magic (TED@NYC 2013)
Reality Pedagogy: Christopher Emdin at TEDxTeachersCollege (2012)

American columnists
Columbia University faculty
Teachers College, Columbia University faculty
Living people
Year of birth missing (living people)